Altaf Mazid Rija (  13 April 2016), known professionally as Altaf Mazid, was an Indian documentary filmmaker and critic in the Assamese cinema. He also worked as a film producer and director in Jollywood. His last documentary was Sabin Alun (The Broken Song) that revolves around Karbi people. He was later appointed as a jury of film festivals, including 10th International Documentary Film Festival Amsterdam and the 9th Dubai International Film Festival among others.

He was born around 1957 in Guwahati, India. He served as an executive engineer in Assam at the Department of Public Health Engineering. He had one daughter.His wife Dr Zabeen Ahmed is the former Librarian of Cotton University, Assam.

Career 
Before his debut in filmmaking career, he initially worked as a film critic in Assamese cinema. He also served as a jury of various film festivals such as 1992 International Film Festival of India, 1997 Yamagata International Documentary Film Festival, 7th Bengaluru International Film Festival and 2015 International Film Festival of Kerala. Later, he was appointed as a jury-member by the International Federation of Film Critics in 2014 at Moscow International Film Festival. Prior to this, he served jury of Cannes Film Festival. In 1999, he was appointed by the International Film Festival of India as a member of the selection committee.

He screened digital version of Joymoti, the first Assamese film and presented it at film festivals, including Seventh Asiatica Film Mediale at Rome Film Festival.

Filmography

Awards and nominations

Death 
Altaf Mazid died of myocardial infarction on 13 April 2016 in Bengaluru, India.

References

External links 
 
 Altaf Mazid at Academia.edu

1957 births
2016 deaths
Indian documentary film directors
Assamese-language film directors
Indian film critics
Artists from Guwahati
Best Critic National Film Award winners